Ramón Rosario Rodríguez (10 September 1927 in Orocovis, Puerto Rico – 24 July 2014) was a Puerto Rican shot putter who competed in the 1952 Summer Olympics.

References

1927 births
2014 deaths
People from Orocovis, Puerto Rico
Puerto Rican shot putters
Male shot putters
Olympic track and field athletes of Puerto Rico
Athletes (track and field) at the 1952 Summer Olympics
Puerto Rican male track and field athletes
Central American and Caribbean Games gold medalists for Puerto Rico
Competitors at the 1954 Central American and Caribbean Games
Central American and Caribbean Games medalists in athletics